The William McCormick Blair Estate is a historic estate at 982 Sheridan Road in Lake Bluff, Illinois. The estate was built in 1926-28 for financier William McCormick Blair, who was one of the many wealthy and prominent Chicagoans to build an estate in Lake Bluff in the early twentieth century. Architect David Adler, a well-regarded designer of country houses, designed the estate's main house in the Colonial Revival style. The house has a complex, sprawling shape unified by the consistent use of double-hung windows and wood roofing shingles. The estate also includes a garage, a tennis house, two cottages, two sheds, a folly shaped like a Greek temple, a greenhouse, and a garden.

The estate was added to the National Register of Historic Places on January 31, 2008.

References

National Register of Historic Places in Lake County, Illinois
Houses on the National Register of Historic Places in Illinois
Colonial Revival architecture in Illinois
Houses completed in 1928
Lake Bluff, Illinois